The 1994 Michigan gubernatorial election was held on November 8, 1994, to elect the Governor and Lieutenant Governor of the state of Michigan.  Incumbent Governor John Engler, a member of the Republican Party, was re-elected over Democratic Party nominee and Congressman Howard Wolpe.  The voter turnout was 45.5%.

Primaries

Republican Primary
Engler, who was narrowly elected in 1990, ran unopposed in the GOP Primary and retained Lt. Gov. Connie Binsfeld as his running mate.

Democratic Primary
Wolpe, who had served 7 terms in Congress before retiring in 1993, won a 4-way battle for the Democratic nomination, taking 35 percent of the vote. He bested his closest rival, state Sen. Debbie Stabenow, who had 30 percent. Wolpe eventually chose Stabenow as his running mate.

Polling

Results

Results by county

References

Governor
1994
Michigan